Thalassionema is a genus of Chromista belonging to the family Thalassionemataceae.

The genus was described in 1902 by Grunow ex Mereschkowsky.

Species:
 Thalassionema nitzschioides Grunow, 1862

References

Fragilariophyceae